Atrophodermia vermiculata presents with erythematous follicular papules on the cheeks in childhood and, with time, the lesions develop into pit-like depressions.

See also 
 Skin lesion
 Cicatricial alopecia
 Ulerythema
 List of cutaneous conditions

References

External links 

Genodermatoses
Genetic disorders with OMIM but no gene
Syndromes affecting the skin